Bolshiye Udoly is a rural locality (a village) in Gorod Vyazniki, Vyaznikovsky District, Vladimir Oblast, Russia. The population was 28 as of 2010.

Geography 
Bolshiye Udoly is located on the Udolskoye Lake, 12 km northeast of Vyazniki (the district's administrative centre) by road. Malye Udoly is the nearest rural locality.

References 

Rural localities in Vyaznikovsky District